Thalerommata is a genus of brushed trapdoor spiders, first described by Anton Ausserer in 1875. , it contains only three species from Mexico and Colombia.

References

Barychelidae
Mygalomorphae genera
Spiders of Mexico
Spiders of South America
Taxa named by Anton Ausserer